Qi Guangpu (born October 20, 1990 in Xuzhou) is a Chinese aerial skier. He is a double world champion and the reigning Olympic champion in Aerials, who won gold at the 2022 Winter Olympics.

Career
Qi Guangpu competed at the 2010, 2014, 2018, and 2022 Winter Olympic Games. Although his performance in his first 3 Olympics was unsuccessful, and failing to win a medal (with a 4th place in 2014), his records at the FIS Freestyle World Ski Championships is much better, with a haul of 2 golds and 2 silvers from 2011 to 2017. He won a silver medal at the 2011 World in Deer Valley, USA, and upgraded that to gold in 2013 in Voss, Norway. He successfully defended his world title at the 2015 World in Kreischberg, Austria. He followed that in 2017 with a silver.

He did very well at the 2022 Winter Olympics, where he won gold in the Aerials after he landed a quintuple-twisting triple backflip in the final round and earned 129 points, easily beating defending champion Oleksandr Abramenko, who had come second after scoring 116.5. He had also participated in the Mixed Aerials, where his team won silver.

References 

1990 births
Living people
Olympic freestyle skiers of China
Freestyle skiers at the 2010 Winter Olympics
Freestyle skiers at the 2014 Winter Olympics
Freestyle skiers at the 2018 Winter Olympics
Freestyle skiers at the 2022 Winter Olympics
Medalists at the 2022 Winter Olympics
Olympic gold medalists for China
Olympic silver medalists for China
Olympic medalists in freestyle skiing
Chinese male freestyle skiers
Skiers from Jiangsu